Miami is the seventh studio album by James Gang, released in 1974.

This album is the last with lead guitarist Tommy Bolin before he left to join Deep Purple. The front cover is a black version of their second album, James Gang Rides Again with the new title and a pink flamingo added at the bottom.

Critical reception

Writing for Allmusic, critic Stephen Thomas Erlewine wrote of the album "Again, there was a noticeable lack of memorable songs, but Miami is worthwhile for guitar aficionados."

Track listing
All songs by Tommy Bolin, except where noted.
 "Cruisin' Down the Highway" (Bolin, Dale Peters) – 3:16
 "Do It" (Bolin, Roy Kenner) – 3:38
 "Wildfire" (Bolin, John Tesar)  – 3:30
 "Sleepwalker" (Bolin, Tesar) – 4:01
 "Miami Two-Step" (Bolin, Peters, Jim Fox) – 1:32
 "Praylude" – 2:33
 "Red Skies" – 3:27
 "Spanish Lover" (Bolin, Jeff Cook) – 3:43
 "Summer Breezes" – 2:40
 "Head Above the Water" (Bolin, Peters) – 4:18

Personnel 
Roy Kenner – lead (all but 8) and backing vocals
Tommy Bolin – guitars, lead vocals (8)
Tom Dowd – keyboards, piano
Albhy Galuten – keyboards, piano, synthesizer (10)
Dale Peters – bass guitar, backing vocals, percussion
Jimmy "Jim" Fox – drums, backing vocals, percussion, keyboards, organ

Charts

References

James Gang albums
1974 albums
Albums produced by Tom Dowd
Albums with cover art by Jimmy Wachtel
Atco Records albums